The Kazakh Whiteheaded is a breed of beef cattle from Kazakhstan and Russia. The breed was developed between 1930 and 1950 on state farms in the Kazakh republic and the Lower Volga by crossing Hereford cattle with local Kazakh and Kalmyk stock. The breed resembles the Hereford in colour and conformation while incorporating the hardiness of the local breeds. In 1990 the population of the breed in Kazakhstan was estimated at 1,334,000.

References

External links
 Food and Agriculture Organisation genetic resources study

Cattle breeds originating in Kazakhstan
Agriculture in Kazakhstan
Agriculture in Russia
Agriculture in Mongolia
Agriculture in the Soviet Union
Animal breeds originating in the Soviet Union
Cattle breeds